Petra Zakouřilová (born 5 September 1978 in Liberec) is an alpine skier from the Czech Republic.  She competed for the Czech Republic at the 2002, 2006 and 2010 Winter Olympics.   Her best result in the Olympics was a 16th place in the 2002 combined.

References

External links

1978 births
Living people
Czech female alpine skiers
Olympic alpine skiers of the Czech Republic
Alpine skiers at the 2002 Winter Olympics
Alpine skiers at the 2006 Winter Olympics
Alpine skiers at the 2010 Winter Olympics
Sportspeople from Liberec